Dark Shadows: Curse of the Pharaoh is a Big Finish Productions original dramatic reading based on the long-running American horror soap opera series Dark Shadows.

External links
Dark Shadows - Curse of the Pharaoh
Dark Shadows - Curse of the Pharaoh by Stephen Mark Rainey

Dark Shadows audio plays
2009 audio plays